Edinburgh Institution may refer to:
 Edinburgh Institution F.P., a former Edinburgh rugby union club
 Stewart's Melville College, formerly Edinburgh Institution for Languages and Mathematics
 Royal Scottish Academy, formerly Royal Institution for the Encouragement of the Fine Arts